Jonesville is a city in Hillsdale County in the U.S. state of Michigan.  The population was 2,176 at the 2020 census.

History
The area was first settled by brothers Benaiah and Edmund Jones, who came here from Painesville, Ohio in 1828 and purchased land the next year.  They surveyed and platted the community by 1831.  It served as the first county seat of Hillsdale County, which was formally organized in 1835.  The Jonesville post office opened on January 21, 1841.  The community incorporated as a village in 1855.  Jonesville once contained a railway station along the Lake Shore and Michigan Southern Railway.  

In August 2014, the village voted to adopt a charter and incorporated as a city.

The city contains three listings on the National Register of Historic Places: J.J. Deal and Son Carriage Factory, Grace Episcopal Church, and the E.O. Grosvenor House.  All three of these are also Michigan State Historic Sites, and the city also includes the state historic sites the Delevan (Munro) House and Kiddie Brush and Toy Company.  The toy company occupied the same building as the Carriage Factory, which is now renovated as an apartment complex.

Geography

The St. Joseph River flows through the city.

Major highways
 runs southwest through the center of the city.
 runs south–north through the city and also runs concurrently with US 12 for a short distance.

Demographics

2010 census
As of the census of 2010, there were 2,258 people, 894 households, and 596 families living in the village. The racial makeup of the village was 95.3% White, 2.1% African American, 0.3% Native American, 0.9% Asian, 0.3% from other races, and 1.1% from two or more races. Hispanic or Latino of any race were 2.1% of the population.

There were 894 households, of which 30.1% had children under the age of 18 living with them, 48.2% were married couples living together, 13.4% had a female householder with no husband present, 5.0% had a male householder with no wife present, and 33.3% were non-families. 29.1% of all households were made up of individuals, and 14.8% had someone living alone who was 65 years of age or older. The average household size was 2.41 and the average family size was 2.95.

The median age in the village was 37.6 years. 26.3% of residents were under the age of 18; 9.2% were between the ages of 18 and 24; 23.3% were from 25 to 44; 23.8% were from 45 to 64; and 17.4% were 65 years of age or older. The gender makeup of the village was 47.4% male and 52.6% female.

2000 census
As of the census of 2000, there were 2,337 people, 926 households, and 623 families living in the village. The racial makeup of the village was 96.02% White, 1.93% African American, 0.26% Native American, 0.21% Asian, 0.39% from other races, and 1.20% from two or more races. Hispanic or Latino of any race were 1.80% of the population.

There were 926 households, out of which 31.0% had children under the age of 18 living with them, 54.1% were married couples living together, 10.0% had a female householder with no husband present, and 32.7% were non-families. 28.9% of all households were made up of individuals, and 13.2% had someone living alone who was 65 years of age or older.  The average household size was 2.39 and the average family size was 2.92.

In the village, the population was spread out, with 27.9% under the age of 18, 8.0% from 18 to 24, 26.4% from 25 to 44, 22.4% from 45 to 64, and 15.2% who were 65 years of age or older.  The median age was 36 years. For every 100 females, there were 102.0 males.  For every 100 females age 18 and over, there were 93.8 males.

The median income for a household in the village was $35,223, and the median income for a family was $41,813. Males had a median income of $34,135 versus $23,333 for females. The per capita income for the village was $15,877.  About 6.5% of families and 9.9% of the population were below the poverty line, including 9.5% of those under age 18 and 5.8% of those age 65 or over.

Education
The city is served entirely by its own school district, Jonesville Community Schools, which also serves large areas of several neighboring townships.

Images

References

External links
City of Jonesville official website

Cities in Hillsdale County, Michigan
Populated places established in 1828
1828 establishments in Michigan Territory
Former county seats in Michigan